Division 3 is the fifth level in the league system of Swedish women's football and comprises 26 sections with 10-12  football teams in each.

Current sections - 2019 season

Ångermanland
Anundsjö IF | Arnäs IF | Bik SK | Hägglunds IoFK lag 2 | Härnösands SK | Högakusten | Långsele AIF | Molidens IK | Själevads IK lag 2   

Bohuslän/Dalsland
Gilleby/Stala Orust FC | Hamburgsunds IF | H E F Valbo BK | Herrestads AIF | Kroppefjälls IF | Ljungskile SK | IK Rössö United | Stenungsunds IF | Tjörns DFF | Vallens FF 
 
Dalarna
Avesta DFK | Dala-Järna IK | Forssa BK | Gagnefs IF | Gustafs GoIF U | IFK Hedemora FK | IFK Mora FK | Kvarnsvedens IK U | Leksands IF | Östansbo IS A  

Gästrikland
Brynäs IF/FK | Hille IF | Hofors AIF | IK Huge 2 | IFK Gävle 2 | NorrHam | Stensätra IF 2 | Strömsbro IF 2 | Strömsbro IF 3 | Valbo FF | Valbo FF 2 | Åbyggeby/Ockelbo | Årsunda IF  

Göteborg
Bergums IF | Göteborgs Studenters IF | Hällesåker IF | Landvetter 2003 | Lerums IS | Lindome GIF | Mossens BK | Näsets SK | Öckerö IF | Torslanda FC | Utbynäs SK | Ytterby IS

Halland
BK Astrio | Falkenbergs FF 2 | IFK Fjärås | IS Halmia 2 | Kungsbacka IF | Laholms FK | IF Norvalla 2 | Tvååker/Galtabäck | Tölö IF 2 | Åsa IF   

Hälsingland
Bollnäs GIF FF | Edsbyns IF FF | Enångers IK/ Iggesund | Kilafors IF | Moheds SK | Strömsbruks IF | Stugsunds IK | IF Team Hudik 2 | Trönö IK | Wallviks IK  

Jämtland-Härjedalens
Brunflo FK | Frösö IF 2 | Häggenås SK | Krokom/Dvärsätts IF 2 | Mörsils IF | Offerdals IF | Ope IF | IFK Strömsund | Svegs IK | Ås IF  

Medelpad
Alby FF | Alnö IF | Heffnersklubbans BK | Lucksta IF | Matfors IF | Selånger FK U | Stöde IF | Sunds IF 2 | Sundsvalls DFF 2 | Söråkers FF | IFK Timrå | Torpshammars IF  

Norrbotten
Bergnäsets AIK | Blåsmarks SK | Gammelgårdens IF | Infjärdens SK | Luleå SK/Lira BK | Munksund/ Skuthamn SK | SSK/ FC Norrsken | Trångfors IF | Älvsby IF | Öjeby IF  

Örebro
Frövi IK | GSBK | IFK Kumla | Laxå IF | Lillån FK | Nora-Pershyttan BK | Rynninge IK | IK Sturehov | Öfvre Adolfsberg FC | Örebro SK Ungdom  

Östergötland
Eneby BK | Lindö FF | Linghems SK | Lkpg Kenty DFF B | Lotorps IF | Mjölby AI FF | Mjölby Södra IF | Smedby AIS B | BK Tinnis | Vadstena GoIF  

Skåne östra
Bjärnums GoIF | FC Hessleholm | Gärsnäs AIS | Hammenhögs IF | Hörby FF | IFK Osby | IFÖ Bromölla IF | Köpingebro IF | Sjöbo IF | Vittsjö DFK | Wä IF | Åhus IF  

Skåne västra
Backarnas FF | BK Kick | BK Olympic | BK Vången | Eskilsminne DIF | Hallands Nation | Hardeberga BK | Helsingborgs DFF | IFK Trelleborg | IK Wormo | Lunds BK | Råå IF | Svalövs BK  

Småland norra
Egnahems BK | Hovslätts IK | Hultsfred/Lojal | Husqvarna FF B | Hvetlanda GIF | Kristinebergs FF | Ormaryds IF | Rödsle BK | Torpa AIS | Vimmerby IF  

Småland sydöstra
Emmaboda IS | IFK Kalmar B | Kalmar Södra IF | Karlskrona FF | Lindsdals IF B | IF Lörbytjejerna | Nättraby GoIF | Ronneby BK | Runsten/Möckleby IF | Rödeby FC 

Småland sydvästra
Alvesta GIF | Gislaveds IS | Hovshaga AIF | Lessebo GoIF | RefteleÅs | Tingsryd United FC | IFK Värnamo B | Växjö FF | Åseda IF | FK Älmeboda/Linneryd  

Södermanland
Flens IF Södra | Hällbybrunns IF | IFK Nyköping 2 | IK Tun | Nyköpings BIS | Oxelösunds IK | Slagsta United DFF | Triangelns IK 2 | DFK Värmbol | Åkers IF  

Stockholm A
AIK DFF | Brommapojkarna DFF | FC Djursholm | Hässelby SK FF | IFK Viksjö | IK Frej | P 18 IK | Skå IK | Vallentuna BK Dam | Åkersberga BK

Stockholm B
Boo FF | Djurgården TFF | Huddinge IF | Nacka Dam FK | Rönninge/Salem Fotboll | Salem FF | Segeltorps IF | Stuvsta FF | Älta IF | Älvsjö AIK FF

Uppland
Fanna BK | Gamla Upsala SK 1 | Håbo FF | Lagga/ Långhundra BK | IFK Mariehamn | IK Rex | Rimbo IF | Rosersbergs IK | Upplands-Ekeby IF | Östervåla IF   

Värmland
Eda IF | FK QBIK | Hertzöga BK | IF Kil | Kila/Sifhälla | Kronans FK | Norrstrands IF | Råtorps IK | Rävåsens IK | Skattkärrs IF | Villastadens IF U   

Västerbotten
Burträsk FF | Clemensnäs IF | Flurkmarks IK | Kågedalens AIF | Mariehem FF | Morön City BK | Nysätra IF | Sandviks IK | Spöland Vännäs IF | Södra Ungdom FF | Sörböle FF | Umedalens IF   

Västergötland norra
Falköpings DIK | Hörnebo SK | Lidköpings IF | Mariestads BoIS DFF | Sils DIF | Skoftebyns IF | Tidaholm | Trollhättans FK | Ulvåkers IF | Vedums AIS 
 
Västergötland södra
Bergdalens IK | Byttorps IF | Holmalunds IF | HUS FF | Lödöse Nygård | Nittorps IK | Sollebrunns AIK | Tranemo IF | Ulricehamns IFK | IFK Örby   

Västmanland
Arboga Södra IF | Forsby FF | IK Franke | Gideonsberg IF U1 | Götlunda IF | Norrby SK | Rytterne IS | Sala FF | Skiljebo SK | Västerås BK 30 U

External links 
Swedish Football Association (Svenska Fotbollförbundet) - Kontaktuppgifter och tävlingar

References

5
Summer association football leagues